Laine Tarvis (née Laine Aaslaid; born 26 September 1937 in Sääre) is an Estonian politician. She was a member of IX Riigikogu.

She has been a member of Estonian Centre Party.

References

Living people
1937 births
Women members of the Riigikogu
Members of the Riigikogu, 1999–2003
Members of the Riigikogu, 1995–1999
Estonian Centre Party politicians
Recipients of the Order of the White Star, 4th Class
University of Tartu alumni
People from Saaremaa Parish
21st-century Estonian women politicians